This was the first edition of the tournament.

Pedro Sousa won the title after defeating Casper Ruud 6–0, 3–6, 6–3 in the final.

Seeds

Draw

Finals

Top half

Bottom half

References
Main Draw
Qualifying Draw

Braga Open - Singles
Braga